According to the folklore of Trinidad and Tobago and Guyana this immensely tall spectre stands at the crossroads on nights of the full moon with his legs wide apart, straddling the road. If you try to pass under him, interrupting his moongazing, he snaps his legs shut, crushing and killing you. Their only warning is a shrill, spine-tingling whistle which he emits just before his assault. He can make himself invisible, his presence only made known by the shadow he casts in the moonlight. If you walk around him, quietly and politely, he will let you be, but if you taunt him and distract his gaze from the moon, he consumes your brain through the palm of his massive hand. 

In some regions he is known as the Moongazer.

Notes

External links
 Trinidad and Tobago Folklore Characters

Caribbean legendary creatures
Mythic humanoids
Mythological monsters
Trinidad and Tobago culture